Skjervøy is the administrative centre in Skjervøy Municipality in Troms og Finnmark county, Norway. The town is located on the island of Skjervøya along the Kvænangen, near the mouth of the Reisafjorden.

The village's economy is based on the fishing industry.  It is a stop on the Hurtigruten express boats.  The historic Skjervøy Church is located in this village.  The village is connected to the mainland by the Skattørsundet Bridge (which connects to Kågen island) and then the Maursund Tunnel (which connects Kågen to the mainland).

References

Villages in Troms
Skjervøy